The 2008 Cronulla-Sutherland Sharks season was the 42nd in the club's history. Coached by Ricky Stuart and captained by Paul Gallen and Greg Bird, they competed in the National Rugby League's 2008 Telstra Premiership, finishing the regular season 3rd (out of 16) to qualify for the finals. The Sharks then came within one game of the Grand Final but were knocked out by eventual runners-up Melbourne Storm.

Season summary
The Sharks began the season on a positive note, with a victory over 2007 runners-up Manly Sea Eagles in Round 1 followed by a shock 17-16 victory over 2007 grand final winners Melbourne in Round 2. The match against the Storm was marred by an on-field brawl after an illegal tackle by Cronulla's Ben Ross on Melbourne's Cooper Cronk, resulting in both Ross and Melbourne's Brett White being sent off and later being referred to the NRL Judiciary.

The Sharks' season of promise was however marred by the late season suspension of star player Greg Bird, following its round 24, 20-0 win over top four contenders the Sydney Roosters at home. Bird was accused of glassing his then-girlfriend Katie Milligan and was stood down by the club just a fortnight out from the finals. Furthermore, five-eighth Brett Seymour suffered a knee injury during the finals; robbing the Sharks of any valuable halves experience at the wrong end of the season. Bird was later sacked by the Sharks; since then he has been exonerated over the glassing incident and he now plays for the Gold Coast Titans.

The Sharks ended the season joint minor premiers with Manly and Melbourne (third on points differential) and many believed this was the year Cronulla would finally win its maiden premiership. The Sharks won its first final in style, thrashing the Canberra Raiders 36-10 at home with Misi Taulapapa, a Warriors outcast scoring a hat-trick. Due to the Melbourne Storm losing its first final, the Sharks earned the week off along with Manly. It was during this time that Seymour suffered his knee injury, ending his 2008 season. The Sharks' season ended with a disappointing 28-0 defeat at the hands of the Melbourne Storm whose captain Cameron Smith was suspended a week earlier for a grapple tackle on Brisbane's Sam Thaiday.

Ladder

Results

References

Cronulla-Sutherland Sharks seasons
Cronulla-Sutherland Sharks